Trenesha Biggers (born December 25, 1981) is an American former model and professional wrestler. She is best known for her appearances with Total Nonstop Action Wrestling under the ring name Rhaka Khan; she also appeared with WWE as Trenesha, competing in the 2005 WWE Diva Search.

Early life
Biggers played volleyball and basketball in high school while in Jacksonville, Illinois and later while attending Illinois Central College in the 2000–01 season. She continued to play in both sports after transferring to the College of Southern Idaho for the 2001–02 season. In 2002, Biggers transferred to Florida State University where she lettered in volleyball.

Professional wrestling career

World Wrestling Entertainment developmental (2005–2006)
Biggers entered the WWE Diva Search, but was eliminated during the top 25. World Wrestling Entertainment later expressed interest in Biggers and signed her to a developmental contract. After signing a developmental contract with WWE, she was assigned to Deep South Wrestling. Biggers trained with Marty Jannetty for two months prior to reporting to Deep South Wrestling. Biggers debuted in DSW as the valet of The Regulators. Later, she and Angel Williams began a feud with Kristal Marshall, Tracy Taylor, and Michelle McCool. On February 9, 2006, Biggers participated in a bikini contest; however, there was no winner due to an interruption by Palmer Canon. Biggers and Williams later accompanied Canon in a match against Tommy Dreamer, who had McCool, Taylor, and Marshall in his corner. On May 4, 2006, WWE released Biggers from her developmental contract.

Independent circuit (2006–2008)
After WWE released Biggers from her developmental contract, she began wrestling for Japan's Pro Wrestling ZERO1-MAX promotion as "Panther Claw". She also worked for Florida's Full Impact Pro and Philadelphia's Women's Extreme Wrestling promotions. In Women's Extreme Wrestling, she worked under the name "Black Barbie" and later just "Barbie".

Total Nonstop Action Wrestling (2008–2009)

On February 10, 2008, Biggers made her Total Nonstop Action Wrestling debut at the Against All Odds pay-per-view. She distracted Petey Williams during his match against Scott Steiner, helping Steiner to win. On the following edition of Impact!, Steiner introduced Biggers as "Rhaka Khan" (the moniker a homage to soul singer Chaka Khan). She later managed Petey Williams in his matches. She made her in-ring debut on the March 27, 2008 live edition of Impact! alongside Steiner and Williams against The Latin American Xchange (LAX) and Salinas. Her team lost after Homicide pinned Williams with a bridging T-Bone suplex. At Lockdown, she participated in the first ever "Queen of the Cage" match, which was won by Roxxi Laveaux. At Sacrifice, she participated in the first ever "Make Over Battle Royal" won by Gail Kim. On the October 2, 2008, edition of Impact!, Rhaka Khan turned face and teamed up with ODB to defeat The Beautiful People. At Bound for Glory IV, she teamed with ODB and Rhino to defeat The Beautiful People and Cute Kip.

On the November 6 edition of Impact!, Khan turned heel and attacked her tag team partner, Taylor Wilde, during a match against Awesome Kong and Raisha Saeed. After the match, the evil Khan officially aligned herself with Kong and Saeed. The three of them were joined by Sojourner Bolt to form the stable known as Kongtourage, which began feuding with ODB, Christy Hemme, Taylor Wilde and Roxxi. On the February 26, 2009, edition of Impact! Khan and Bolt turned into fan favorites and defeated their former stable mates in a tag team match. In April 2009, both Rhaka Khan and Roxxi were suspended for 60 days (legit) after they got into a heated backstage altercation after Roxxi confronted Khan for working too stiff. She returned as an active wrestler on June 19, 2009, losing to Jacqueline at a house show in Grand Rapids, Michigan. She then appeared at another TNA house show in Johnson City, Tennessee on July 17, 2009 and lost to Daffney after receiving a botched Northern lights suplex which drove her headfirst onto the mat. The match was quickly ended and Khan was helped from the ring. On October 1, 2009, Biggers was released from her TNA contract and her profile and photos were removed from the "Knockouts" section of TNA's website.

Lucha Libre USA (2010–2011)
After leaving TNA, Biggers appeared in the first season of Lucha Libre USA, which later aired in mid-2010, as Biggers debuted under the name Tigresa Caliente. Tigresa was featured in a few matches and backstage segments including feuding with Mini Park. She would then align herself with Chi Chi. She returned again in the second season not with Chi Chi, but with Mini Park's ex-wife. It was during this season that Tigresa attempted to murder two minis, Mascarita Dorada and Octagoncito. On the first episode of the second season, Trenesha was managing his ex-wife. In the second episode she tagged with her in a losing effort. On the November 19, 2011 episode of Lucha Libre USA, Caliente teamed up with Chrissy Cialis and Jacqueline Moore in a losing effort to the team of Nikki Corleone, Rebecca Reyes and ODB.

Personal life
Biggers was previously in a relationship with fellow professional wrestler Kurt Angle. On August 15, 2009, Biggers obtained a protection from abuse (PFA) order against Angle and had police officers remove him from their house. The PFA was later voluntarily withdrawn by Biggers. On August 24, 2019, it was reported that Biggers had been placed on El Paso's most wanted fugitive's list for the week of August 25. She is wanted by the El Paso Police Department on a charge of interference with child custody.
A recording has surfaced and is currently circulating online of her ex-husband, a former independent wrestler, admitting to making several false police reports against her as well as false reports to Child Protective Services. He is currently on probation for beating Khan unconscious in front of their new born baby and Khan's then four year old daughter.

Championships and accomplishments
 Pro Wrestling Illustrated
 Ranked No. 46 of the best female singles wrestlers in the PWI Female 50 in 2008.

References

External links

 
 
 

1981 births
African-American female professional wrestlers
Florida State University alumni
American female professional wrestlers
Living people
Professional wrestlers from Illinois
Sportspeople from Champaign, Illinois
WWE Diva Search contestants
African-American sportswomen
Southern Idaho Golden Eagles women's basketball players
Southern Idaho Golden Eagles women's volleyball players
Illinois Central Cougars women's basketball players
21st-century African-American sportspeople
21st-century African-American women
20th-century African-American people
20th-century African-American women